Cambodia first competed at the Asian Games in 1954.

Summer Games Results

Medals by Summer Sport

Medal tables

Medalist by Asian Games

References

 Beautiful First Goal Medal for Cambodia, Retrieved 2015.6.13